Anatolius of Naples (date of birth unknown; died 638) was the third Duke of Naples, reigning from circa 625 until his death in 638.

The Dukes of Naples 
The Dukes of Naples were a line of military commanders of a Byzantine outpost in Italy between 661 and 1137. During their tenure, the dukes of Naples defended the coast of Italy from Terracina, north of Gaeta, to Palermo, on the western tip of Sicily.

638 deaths

7th-century dukes of Naples